Zantheres is a genus of spiders in the family Lycosidae. It was first described in 1887 by Thorell. , it contains only one species, Zantheres gracillimus, found in Myanmar.

References

Lycosidae
Monotypic Araneomorphae genera
Spiders of Asia